Kathie Conway is a Republican former member of the Missouri House of Representatives. Conway represented the 104th District, which encompasses portions of St. Charles County, Missouri. She was first elected to the Missouri House in November 2010.

Early life, education and career
Conway was born in Jerseyville, Illinois and graduated from Alton Senior High School in 1973. Following graduation she attended Western Illinois University in Macomb, earning a bachelor's degree Law Enforcement Administration in 1977. Prior to entering politics Conway was a civil and criminal investigator in the St. Louis and eastern Missouri areas. She and husband Patrick are the parents of one son.

Politics
Conway was a newcomer to elected politics when she decided to run for the 14th District Missouri House seat in 2010. Republican incumbent Joe Smith was term-limited from serving again. Conway ran unopposed in the August primary, then defeated Democrat Kyle Meadows in the November general election.

Legislative assignments
Representative Conway serves on the following committees:
 Appropriations - Public Safety and Corrections, Chairman
 Select Budget Committee
 Fiscal Review
 Crime Prevention and Public Safety
 Joint Committee on Government Oversight – Vice Chair

Electoral history

References

1955 births
21st-century American politicians
21st-century American women politicians
Living people
Republican Party members of the Missouri House of Representatives
People from Jerseyville, Illinois
People from St. Charles, Missouri
Western Illinois University alumni
Women state legislators in Missouri